Tătăreşti may refer to:

 Tătăreşti, a village in Viile Satu Mare Commune, Satu Mare County, Romania
Tătăreşti, a commune in Cahul district, Moldova
Tătăreşti, a commune in Străşeni district, Moldova

See also 
 Tătaru (disambiguation)
 Tătărășeni (disambiguation)
 Tătărăștii (disambiguation)